Breitenlohe is a part of the city Burghaslach, Bavaria, Germany. Breitenlohe has about 100 inhabitants and is part of the administrative district Landkreis Neustadt an der Aisch-Bad Windsheim.

Castle
Well known is the castle from the 16th century. It was originally a moated castle, but the moat is dry. It has six towers, in two of them are staircases. Before the castle was built in 1569, there was already a kind of castle in the same place. The first castle was built in 1340 for Albrecht von Hohenlohe and later sold to the Family von Vestenberg, who renovated the castle and later rebuilt it. The castle is not open to the public.

Church
Close to the castle is the Catholic church of Exaltatio S. Crucis, also built in the 16th century.

Social life
Breitenlohe has an auxiliary fire brigade.

External links
 Homepage of the castle

Literature 
 Natascha Meuser: Schloss Breitenlohe: Architektur und Baugeschichte, DOM publishers, Berlin 2014, .

Towns in Bavaria